Luís Maimona João (born February 1, 1981 in Luanda), nicknamed Lamá, is a retired Angolan football goalkeeper, who played for Petro Luanda in the Girabola.

International career
Lamá is a member of his national team, and was called up to the 2006 World Cup. He was part of Angola's 2001 FIFA Youth Championship squad. He was first-choice for Angola at the 2008 Africa Cup of Nations in Ghana and performed really well, making some key saves during the competition.

National team statistics

References

External links
 
 

1981 births
2006 Africa Cup of Nations players
2006 FIFA World Cup players
2008 Africa Cup of Nations players
2010 Africa Cup of Nations players
2011 African Nations Championship players
2013 Africa Cup of Nations players
Angola international footballers
Angolan footballers
Atlético Petróleos de Luanda players
Association football goalkeepers
Living people
Footballers from Luanda
Angola A' international footballers